Chuck Rocha is an American political consultant, Democratic Party strategist, and former union organizer who is the president of Solidarity Strategies.In 2013 Rocha was convicted of embezzling union funds and sentenced to 24 months probation. In April 2020, the former Bernie Sanders 2020 campaign advisor founded the partisan super PAC Nuestro PAC to turn out Latinos in the 2020 General Election, and co-founded the pro-Biden super PAC "America's Promise."

Career 
Chuck began his political career in East Texas at United Rubber Workers Local 746. By 22, he had become the youngest officer of the 1,200 person local. At 29, he was hired to be the youngest, first person of color and last rank-and-file national political director of the United Steelworkers of America. He is credited for building out one of the top national labor political departments in the country.

In 2010, Rocha left the USW to create Solidarity Strategies, a full-service nonprofit and political consulting firm. Solidarity was built on the idea of diversity, inclusion and mentorship opportunities for the next generation of minority professionals. In 10 years, Solidarity has employed over 60 young people of color and has become one of the most successful minority-owned political consulting firms in the nation.

On July 30, 2013, Rocha pleaded guilty to the embezzlement of union funds. He was sentenced to two years of probation and was ordered to pay a fine of $2,000.

Chuck has worked on several presidential, congressional and gubernatorial races, including both of Bernie Sanders' presidential campaigns.

Personal life 
Rocha grew up in East Texas. Rocha is Latino.

References

Year of birth missing (living people)
Living people
American political consultants
Texas Democrats
Bernie Sanders 2020 presidential campaign